Rhinelephas is a genus of butterflies in the family Lycaenidae.

Species
Rhinelephas arrhina Toxopeus, 1928
Rhinelephas cyanicornis (Snellen, 1892)

References

Polyommatini
Lycaenidae genera
Taxa named by Lambertus Johannes Toxopeus